The Thanat–Rusk communiqué is a bilateral diplomatic communiqué that was signed in March 1962 by Thai Foreign Minister Thanat Khoman and United States Secretary of State Dean Rusk. In the communiqué, the United States promised come to Thailand's aid if it faced aggression by neighboring nations. The communiqué built upon an American-Thai relationship that had been established in the 19th century, with the bilateral Treaty of Amity and Commerce of 1833.

The communiqué cemented Thailand's role as an important United States ally in the Asia-Pacific region during the Cold War. In the years that followed the communiqué, the United States would help build up the Royal Thai Armed Forces and modernize Thailand's physical infrastructure. Thai forces would later become involved in the Vietnam War, wherein they supported South Vietnam from the military threats posed by North Vietnam and the Viet Cong. During the duration of the Vietnam War, the United States also gained access to Thai air bases, which supported its deployment of American military air assets as part of its forward positioning strategy.

See also
San Francisco System
Mutual Defense Treaty (United States–Philippines)
ANZUS
Security Treaty between the United States and Japan
Mutual Defense Treaty (United States–South Korea)
Sino-American Mutual Defense Treaty
Southeast Asia Treaty Organization

References

Cold War documents
20th-century military alliances
Cold War alliances and military strategy
Military history of Thailand
Thailand–United States relations
1962 in Thailand